Save a Little Sunshine is a 1938 British comedy film directed by Norman Lee and starring Dave Willis, Pat Kirkwood and Tommy Trinder.

Plot
After he is sacked from his job, Dave Smalley buys a share in a hotel, but has to resort to working there when all other financial schemes fail. His girlfriend Pat however, comes up with the idea of turning the property into a smart restaurant, and business takes off beyond all expectation.

Cast

Production
The film was based on the play Lights Out at Eleven by Armitage Owen. It was made by Welwyn Studios, an affiliate of ABC Pictures, at their Welwyn Garden City Studio. The songs "Save a Little Sunshine" and "Nothing Can Worry Me Now" were composed by Noel Gay. Willis and Kirkwood made a further film together in 1939 - Me and My Pal, also at Welwyn.

Critical reception
TV Guide called it "a harmless entry which offers nothing of value but a few hummable tunes" ; and Britishpictures.com wrote of Tommy Trinder and Max Wall, "these familiar faces provide a smile or two. Certainly the chief interest of the film is to see Max Wall before he developed his legendary grotesque act (and while he still had a full head of hair)."

References

External links

1938 films
1938 comedy films
Films directed by Norman Lee
1930s English-language films
British films based on plays
Films set in England
Films shot at Welwyn Studios
British comedy films
British black-and-white films
1930s British films